The Kon-Tiki Expedition: By Raft Across the South Seas is a 1948 book by the Norwegian writer Thor Heyerdahl. It recounts Heyerdahl's experiences with the Kon-Tiki expedition, where he travelled across the Pacific Ocean on a balsa tree raft. The book was first published in Norway on 2 November 1948, and sold out in 15 days. By 1961, the book had been translated into at least 55 languages. According to a 2013 movie about the expedition the book had been translated into more than 70 languages and sold more than 50 million copies.

References

External links

1948 non-fiction books
Norwegian books
Norwegian-language books
Thor Heyerdahl